The Doomsday Clock is a symbol that represents the likelihood of a human-made global catastrophe, in the opinion of the members of the Bulletin of the Atomic Scientists. Maintained since 1947, the clock is a metaphor for threats to humanity from unchecked scientific and technological advances. A hypothetical global catastrophe is represented by midnight on the clock, with the Bulletins opinion on how close the world is to one represented by a certain number of minutes or seconds to midnight, assessed in January of each year. The main factors influencing the clock are nuclear risk and climate change. The Bulletins Science and Security Board monitors new developments in the life sciences and technology that could inflict irrevocable harm to humanity.

The clock's original setting in 1947 was seven minutes to midnight. It has since been set backward eight times and forward 17 times for a total of 25. The farthest time from midnight was 17 minutes in 1991, and the nearest is 90 seconds, set on January 24, 2023.

The clock was moved to two and a half minutes in 2017, then forward to two minutes to midnight in January 2018, and left unchanged in 2019. In January 2020, it was moved forward to 100 seconds (1 minute, 40 seconds) before midnight. The clock's setting was left unchanged in 2021 and 2022. In January 2023, it was moved forward to 90 seconds (1 minute, 30 seconds) before midnight. Since 2010, the clock has been moved forward four minutes and thirty seconds, and has changed by five minutes and thirty seconds since 1947.

History

The Doomsday Clock's origin can be traced to the international group of researchers called the Chicago Atomic Scientists, who had participated in the Manhattan Project. After the atomic bombings of Hiroshima and Nagasaki, they began publishing a mimeographed newsletter and then the magazine, Bulletin of the Atomic Scientists, which, since its inception, has depicted the Clock on every cover. The Clock was first represented in 1947, when the Bulletin co-founder Hyman Goldsmith asked artist Martyl Langsdorf (wife of Manhattan Project research associate and Szilárd petition signatory Alexander Langsdorf, Jr.) to design a cover for the magazine's June 1947 issue. As Eugene Rabinowitch, another co-founder of the Bulletin, explained later:

 Langsdorf chose a clock to reflect the urgency of the problem: like a countdown, the Clock suggests that destruction will naturally occur unless someone takes action to stop it.

In January 2007, designer Michael Bierut, who was on the Bulletins Governing Board, redesigned the Doomsday Clock to give it a more modern feel. In 2009, the Bulletin ceased its print edition and became one of the first print publications in the U.S. to become entirely digital; the Clock is now found as part of the logo on the Bulletin's website. Information about the Doomsday Clock Symposium, a timeline of the Clock's settings, and multimedia shows about the Clock's history and culture can also be found on the Bulletins website.

The 5th Doomsday Clock Symposium was held on November 14, 2013, in Washington, D.C.; it was a day-long event that was open to the public and featured panelists discussing various issues on the topic "Communicating Catastrophe". There was also an evening event at the Hirshhorn Museum and Sculpture Garden in conjunction with the Hirshhorn's current exhibit, "Damage Control: Art and Destruction Since 1950". The panel discussions, held at the American Association for the Advancement of Science, were streamed live from the Bulletins website and can still be viewed there. Reflecting international events dangerous to humankind, the Clock has been adjusted 25 times since its inception in 1947, when it was set to "seven minutes to midnight".

Basis for settings
"Midnight" has a deeper meaning besides the constant threat of war. There are various elements taken into consideration when the scientists from The Bulletin of the Atomic Scientists decide what Midnight and "global catastrophe" really mean in a particular year. They might include "politics, energy, weapons, diplomacy, and climate science"; potential sources of threat include nuclear threats, climate change, bioterrorism, and artificial intelligence. Members of the board judge Midnight by discussing how close they think humanity is to the end of civilization. In 1947, at the beginning of the Cold War, the Clock was started at seven minutes to midnight.

Fluctuations and threats 
Before January 2020, the two tied-for-lowest points for the Doomsday Clock were in 1953 (when the Clock was set to two minutes until midnight, after the U.S. and the Soviet Union began testing hydrogen bombs) and in 2018, following the failure of world leaders to address tensions relating to nuclear weapons and climate change issues. In other years, the Clock's time has fluctuated from 17 minutes in 1991 to 2 minutes 30 seconds in 2017. Discussing the change to  minutes in 2017, the first use of a fraction in the Clock's history, Lawrence Krauss, one of the scientists from the Bulletin, warned that political leaders must make decisions based on facts, and those facts "must be taken into account if the future of humanity is to be preserved." In an announcement from the Bulletin about the status of the Clock, they went as far to call for action from "wise" public officials and "wise" citizens to make an attempt to steer human life away from catastrophe while humans still can.

On January 24, 2018, scientists moved the clock to two minutes to midnight, based on threats greatest in the nuclear realm. The scientists said, of recent moves by North Korea under Kim Jong-un and the administration of Donald Trump in the U.S.: "Hyperbolic rhetoric and provocative actions by both sides have increased the possibility of nuclear war by accident or miscalculation".

The clock was left unchanged in 2019 due to the twin threats of nuclear weapons and climate change, and the problem of those threats being "exacerbated this past year by the increased use of information warfare to undermine democracy around the world, amplifying risk from these and other threats and putting the future of civilization in extraordinary danger."

On January 23, 2020, the Clock was moved to 100 seconds (1 minute, 40 seconds) before midnight. The Bulletins executive chairman, Jerry Brown, said "the dangerous rivalry and hostility among the superpowers increases the likelihood of nuclear blunder... Climate change just compounds the crisis". The "100 seconds to midnight" setting remained unchanged in 2021 and 2022.

On January 24, 2023, the Clock was moved to 90 seconds (1 minute, 30 seconds) before midnight, meaning that the Clock's current setting is the closest it has ever been to midnight since its inception in 1947. This adjustment was largely attributed to the risk of nuclear escalation that arose from the 2022 Russian invasion of Ukraine. Other reasons that were cited included climate change, biological threats such as COVID-19, and risks associated with disinformation and disruptive technologies.

Reception 
The Doomsday Clock has become a universally recognized metaphor according to The Two-Way, an NPR blog. According to the Bulletin, the Clock attracts more daily visitors to the Bulletin's site than any other feature.

Anders Sandberg of the Future of Humanity Institute has stated that the "grab bag of threats" currently mixed together by the Clock can induce paralysis. People may be more likely to succeed at smaller, incremental challenges; for example, taking steps to prevent the accidental detonation of nuclear weapons was a small but significant step towards avoiding nuclear war. Alex Barasch in Slate argues that "Putting humanity on a permanent, blanket high-alert isn't helpful when it comes to policy or science", and criticizes the Bulletin for neither explaining nor attempting to quantify their methodology.

Cognitive psychologist Steven Pinker harshly criticized the Doomsday Clock as a political stunt, pointing to the words of its founder that its purpose was "to preserve civilization by scaring men into rationality." He stated that it is inconsistent and not based on any objective indicators of security, using as an example its being farther from midnight in 1962 during the Cuban Missile Crisis than in the "far calmer 2007". He argued it was another example of humanity's tendency toward historical pessimism, and compared it to other predictions of self-destruction that went unfulfilled.

Conservative media outlets have often criticized the Bulletin and the Doomsday Clock. Keith Payne writes in the National Review that the Clock overestimates the effects of "developments in the areas of nuclear testing and formal arms control". Tristin Hopper in the National Post acknowledges that "there are plenty of things to worry about regarding climate change", but states that climate change is not in the same league as total nuclear destruction. In addition, some critics accuse the Bulletin of pushing a political agenda.

Timeline

In popular culture 
 "Seven Minutes to Midnight", a 1980 single by Wah! Heat, refers to that year's change of the Doomsday Clock from nine to seven minutes to midnight.
 Australian rock band Midnight Oil's 1984 LP Red Sails in the Sunset features a song called "Minutes to Midnight", and the album's cover shows an aerial-view rendering of Sydney after a nuclear strike. In 1984, lead singer Peter Garrett ran for a seat in the Australian Senate as a candidate for the Nuclear Disarmament Party. He has since been elected to the Australian House of Representatives as a member of the Labor Party and later served as Minister for the Environment.
 The title of Iron Maiden's 1984 song "2 Minutes to Midnight" is a reference to the Doomsday Clock.
 The Doomsday Clock appears in the beginning of the 1985 music video for "Russians" by Sting.
 The 1986 short story "The End of the Whole Mess" by Stephen King refers to the Doomsday Clock being set at fifteen seconds before midnight due to elevated geopolitical tension.
 The Doomsday Clock was a recurring visual theme in Alan Moore and Dave Gibbons's seminal Watchmen graphic novel series (1986–87), its 2009 film adaptation, and its 2019 television miniseries sequel. Additionally its sequel series, which takes place in the main DC Universe, borrows the title.
 The title of Linkin Park's 2007 album Minutes to Midnight is a reference to the Doomsday Clock.
 In the Flobots' song "The Circle in the Square", the lyrics say "the clock is now 11:55 on the big hand", which was the Doomsday Clock's setting in 2012 when the song was released.
 The title of the 1982 Doctor Who episode "Four to Doomsday" references the Doomsday Clock. In the 2017 episode "The Pyramid at the End of the World", the Monks changed every clock in the world to three minutes to midnight as a warning about what will happen if humanity does not accept their help. Representatives of the three most powerful armies on Earth agreed not to fight each other, believing a potential war is the catastrophe. However, the clock remained displaying two minutes to midnight. After the Doctor averted the true catastrophe - an accidental bacteriological disaster, the clock began moving backwards. 
 The Doomsday Clock is featured in Yael Bartana's What if Women Ruled the World, which premiered on July5, 2017 at the Manchester International Festival.
 One minute to midnight on the Doomsday Clock is heavily referenced in the grime/punk crossover song "Effed" by Nottingham rapper Snowy and Jason Williamson of Sleaford Mods. Because of the track's political content, there was an initial reluctance from mainstream radio stations to play the track before the 2019 United Kingdom general election. However, the track was later championed by a number of BBC Radio DJs, including punk innovator Iggy Pop.
 In the Criminal Minds season 13 episode "The Bunker", the unsubs abduct women using the Doomsday Clock.
 The Madam Secretary season 2 episode "On the Clock" features the Doomsday Clock, as the characters try to keep it from moving forward.

See also

 Apocalypticism
 The Bomb (film)
 Climate apocalypse
 Climate Clock
 DEFCON
 Eschatology
 Extinction symbol
 Global catastrophic risk
 Metronome
 Mutual assured destruction
 Nuclear terrorism
 Svalbard Global Seed Vault
 World Scientists' Warning to Humanity

Notes

References

External links
 
 
 Bulletin of the Atomic Scientists
 Doomsday Clock homepage
 Timeline of the Doomsday Clock

 
Alert measurement systems
Clocks
Fear
Nuclear warfare
Political symbols
Symbols introduced in 1947